The Allander Water is a river in East Dunbartonshire and Stirling, Scotland, and one of the three main tributaries of the River Kelvin, the others being the Glazert Water and the Luggie Water. It flows through Milngavie.

See also
List of places in East Dunbartonshire
List of places in Stirling

External links
RCAHMS record of Craigmaddie, Allander Water, Valve chamber
RCAHMS record of Allander Water, Pipe Bridge
Geograph image: Allander Water, Mugdock Wood, nr. Milngavie
Geograph image: Allander Water, near to Allander Toll
West Highland Way and Allander Water
Friends of the River Kelvin

Rivers of East Dunbartonshire
Tributaries of the River Kelvin